Ram Trucks, stylized as RAM and formerly known as the Ram Truck Division (of Chrysler), is an American brand of light to mid-weight trucks and other commercial vehicles, and a division of Stellantis (previously Fiat Chrysler Automobiles).  It was established in a spin-off from Dodge in 2010 using the name of the Ram pickup line of trucks. Ram Trucks' logo was originally used as Dodge's logo. Ram "Classic" trucks are made at the Warren Truck Plant in Warren, Michigan and at the Saltillo plant in Saltillo, Mexico. New series Ram pickups are made at Sterling Heights Assembly in Sterling Heights, Michigan. Since its inception, the brand has used the slogan "Guts. Glory. Ram."

Background
Prior to the 1970s, Dodge had maintained a separate marque for trucks, Fargo Trucks, primarily for use outside the United States. After that point, all trucks made by Chrysler were distributed under the Dodge marque.

In June 2009, when Chrysler emerged from Chapter 11 bankruptcy protection, Fiat Group received a 20% stake in Chrysler Group LLC and Sergio Marchionne was appointed CEO, replacing CEO Robert Nardelli. On June 10 that year substantially all of Chrysler's assets were sold to "New Chrysler", organized as Chrysler Group LLC. The federal government provided support for the deal with US$8 billion in financing at near 21%. Under CEO Marchionne, "World Class Manufacturing" or WCM, a system of thorough manufacturing quality, was introduced and several products re-launched with quality and luxury.  The Ram, Jeep, Dodge, SRT and Chrysler divisions were separated to focus on their own identity and brands.

Ram Trucks was established as a division of Chrysler in 2010, as a spin-off from Dodge, and using the name of the Dodge Ram line of pickups that is now sold under the Ram banner.  According to Chrysler, the Ram Trucks brand will concentrate on "real truck customers", rather than casual truck buyers who buy trucks for image or style.

The Fiat Ducato cargo van design has been adopted and is sold as the Ram ProMaster in North American markets, filling the gap created when Daimler ended production of the Dodge Sprinter in 2008. The goal was to increase truck sales "from today's 280,000 to 415,000 by 2014".

Executives at Chrysler have stated their intention to compete in the semi-trailer truck category with Ram, a possibility that is aided by Fiat's ownership of Iveco and an already available network of Dodge dealers. Ram trucks are marketed separately from Dodge cars; former Ram Division President Fred Diaz stated, "Ram trucks are not a Dodge model. Ram will always be 'vinned' (Vehicle Identification Number) as a Ram. We need to continue to market as Ram so Dodge can have a different brand identity: hip, cool, young, energetic. That will not fit the campaign for truck buyers. The two should have distinct themes."

On July 21, 2011, Fiat bought the Chrysler shares held by the US Treasury increasing its stake in the company.

In April 2013, Diaz left RAM to serve as vice president of Nissan's divisional sales and marketing. He was replaced by Reid Bigland.

Fiat Chrysler formed as a new corporate entity in January 2014.

In August 2014, Ram Trucks CEO Reid Bigland was tapped to lead the Alfa Romeo brand in North America. It was announced that the new head of the Ram Trucks brand would be longtime Chrysler employee Robert Hegbloom, who joined Chrysler in 1986 and had been a director for Dodge. In October 2018, Bigland was promoted to CEO of Ram Trucks. Shortly thereafter, he discovered that the division had been misreporting sales figures and turned over that information to the US government for investigation. Allegedly, FCA cut his bonuses in retaliation, which resulted in Bigland filing a whistleblower lawsuit against FCA. In March 2020, Bigland announced his resignation.

Stellantis formed in 2021 when Fiat Chrysler merged with the French PSA Group.

The Ram brand logo features the head of a ram, formerly the logo used by Dodge.

Trucks
For specifically foreign-market models (designed by Chrysler Europe, etc.), see below.

From 1927 to 1928, all trucks built by Dodge were actually sold under the Graham name, as that company held the marketing rights at that time.

Current
Ram 700 (2014–present): The Fiat Strada, a coupé utility sold in Chile, Bolivia, Colombia, Brazil and Peru, is sold as the Ram 700 in Mexico and South America (formerly known as Ram V700 Express in Chile).
Ram 1000 (2018–present): The Fiat Toro, a compact pickup manufactured in Brazil, is sold in Latin America as the Ram 1000.
Ram pickup (1981–present): The flagship product line, it includes models 1500, 2500, 3500, 4000, 4500, and 5500.
Ram ProMaster Van (2013–present): The line of Fiat Ducato full-size vans are sold as Ram ProMaster vans in North America. The line includes models 1500, 2500, and 3500, with cut-away cab chassis versions available.
Ram ProMaster City/Ram V1000 (2014–present): The Fiat Doblò van is sold as the Ram ProMaster City in North America and the Ram V1000 in Chile.
Ram ProMaster Rapid/Ram V700 Rapid (2014–present): The Latin America-spec Fiat Fiorino van is sold as the Ram ProMaster Rapid in Mexico and the Ram V700 Rapid in Chile, Bolivia, Colombia, and Peru. 
Ram V700 City (2018–present): The European-spec Fiat Fiorino van is sold as the Ram V700 City in Chile.

Former
Dodge Dakota (1987–2011): A midsize pickup, it was moved to the Ram marque with the full-size pickup lineup, although the vehicle retained its physical Dodge branding. It was also rebadged as the Mitsubishi Raider.
Ram H100: The Hyundai Starex was sold as a Ram in Mexico, although the Hyundai badges were kept.
Ram C/V Tradesman (2012–2015): Cargo versions of the then-current Chrysler minivan platform were sold under the Ram marque until replaced by the ProMaster City.
Ram 1200 (2016–2019): The Fiat Fullback / Mitsubishi Triton, a midsize pickup built by a Fiat–Mitsubishi joint venture, was sold as the Ram 1200 in the United Arab Emirates.

Production
Ram vehicles are manufactured at four facilities, two in North America, one in Western Asia, and one in South America.
 Warren Truck Assembly, Warren, Michigan, United States. First opened in 1938, the facility has produced trucks for Dodge and Ram for over 70 years. Near the plant are also the Warren metal stamping plant, Mount Elliot tool and die plant which contribute parts and components to the manufacture of the Dakota and 1500 series. The following models are currently assembled at the plant: Ram 1500 series, all crew cab and double cab models for the global market are assembled here except for the Ram 1500 Laramie, which is built at both the Warren facility and Ram's Saltillo Assembly for the Mexican market.
 Saltillo Truck Assembly, Saltillo, Mexico. The plant manufactures the full range of the Ram truck series as well as the DX Chassis cab and ProMaster van. The plant has won numerous awards and has been recognized as the Chrysler groups best truck facility in terms of build quality. The Saltillo stamping plant is also attached to the facility.

The following models are built at the plant:

Ram 1500 all regular cab models of various trim levels sold globally are manufactured at the facility as is the crew cab Ram 1500 Laramie for the Mexican market.
Ram 2500 all models of various trim levels, cab type, and bed length. Vehicles built here are sold globally.
Ram 3500 all models of various trim levels, cab type, and bed length. Vehicles built here are sold globally.
Ram 4500 all models of various trim levels, cab type, and bed length. Vehicles built here are sold globally.
Ram 5500 all models of various trim levels, cab type, and bed length. Vehicles built here are sold globally.
DX Chassis Cab manufactured for the Mexican and Canadian markets only.
Ram ProMaster

Tofaş, Bursa, Turkey. The plant produces vehicles primarily for the European market; however, the Ram ProMaster City is produced at Tofaş and imported into North America.

Stellantis manufactures some trucks (Ram 1000, for example) in Brazil for the South American markets.

In popular culture
Cordell Walker (Chuck Norris) drove a silver Dodge Ram throughout most of the run of Walker, Texas Ranger after driving a GMC Sierra the first season. The truck was part of a larger product placement deal with Chrysler that saw the other main characters drive other Chrysler vehicles while villains drove vehicles from Chrysler's fellow Detroit rivals General Motors and Ford Motor Company. The Ram was also heavily advertised during commercial breaks throughout the series run on CBS.

A 1995 red Dodge Ram 2500 pickup truck featured prominently throughout the 1996 film Twister as the storm-chasing vehicle used by the two lead characters, played by Bill Paxton and Helen Hunt.

Ram Trucks entered popular culture in an unintentional way on February 4, 2018, during Super Bowl LII. Their commercial's use of Rev. Martin Luther King Jr.'s sermon "The Drum Major Instinct" was quickly and widely panned by audiences, academics, news outlets and social media alike. Of particular concern was its usage of a speech in which King condemned advertising ("we are so often taken by advertisers... those gentlemen of massive verbal persuasion") to sell more Ram Trucks. Within hours, content creators on YouTube had made spin-offs ("What Martin Luther King Actually Thought About Car Commercials", "The MLK Super Bowl Ad Dodge Didn't Show You", "What Dodge LEFT OUT Of Their MLK Commercial In Super Bowl", etc.) that showed a more accurate perspective of King's sermon and opinions about advertising.

Ram trucks feature prominently in Taylor Sheridan's Yellowstone television series as the chosen work vehicles of the Yellowstone Dutton Ranch, featuring the ranch's logo and branding on the sides of the vehicles. The trucks feature a variety of configurations, mostly 3/4 ton 2500-series trucks with the 6.7L Cummins diesel.

See also 
Fiat Professional: This was FCA's global light commercial vehicle brand marketed outside North America, marketing the same vans marketed as Ram in the Americas. In the other part of Stellantis, PSA, all brands except DS Automobiles sell vans in three sizes under their respective brands.

References

External links 

 

 
Dodge
Stellantis
Motor vehicle manufacturers based in Michigan
Vehicle manufacturing companies established in 2010
Truck manufacturers of the United States
Pickup trucks
2010 establishments in Michigan
Car brands